Eutreta simplex is a species of tephritid or fruit flies in the genus Eutreta of the family Tephritidae. During the larval stage they form galls on members of the Asteraceae family, such as Artemesia ludoviciana.

Distribution
United States. They have been documented in California, Colorado, New Mexico, and most recently, Kansas.

References

Tephritinae
Insects described in 1914
Diptera of North America